Aaptos conferta is a species of sea sponge belonging to the family Suberitidae and is found in New Zealand. The species was described in 1994 by Michelle Kelly-Borges & Patricia Bergquist.

References

Aaptos
Animals described in 1994
Taxa named by Patricia Bergquist
Taxa named by Michelle Kelly (marine scientist)